James Sinclair Millner  (29 November 1919 – 24 January 2007) was an Australian corporate executive. He was head of many large organisations including chairman of the NRMA, chairman of Washington H. Soul Pattinson,  New Hope Coal, Brickworks Limited, Choiseul Investments, Queensland Mines Limited and NBN Television.

Biography

Millner was born in Sydney on 29 November 1919. His father Thomas George Millner  was a colonel in the Australian Army and his mother Mary was the daughter of businessman Lewy Pattinson. Millner grew up in Cheltenham, New South Wales, and attended Newington College before studying pharmacy at The University of Sydney. At the breakout of World War II Millner enlisted in the Army Service Corps Officer Training School and was posted to Malaya. When Singapore fell, he became a prisoner of war in Changi Prison Singapore, then later Sandakan, Borneo. He was released at the cessation of hostilities in 1945, shipping out to Morotai and then Balikpapan. Jim Millner married Jean Purdie in 1948. On his return, Millner completed a Materia Medica (Pharmacy) course in 1947 at the University of Sydney, and joined the family company, Washington H. Soul Pattinson, where he rose to be director in 1957. Millner was Chairman of Washington H. Soul Pattinson from 1969 to 1998, when he was succeeded by his nephew, Robert Millner.

Philanthropy and community
Millner supported financially the Australian War Memorial, the Royal Botanical Gardens, Sydney and served on the council of Newington College. His widow, Jean Millner, endowed the Jim Millner Bursary at Newington giving a boy the opportunity to attend the College from Year 7 until the completion of Year 12. In the 1983 Queen's Birthday Honours, Millner was made a Member of the Order of Australia (AM) for "Service to industry and the community".

References

1919 births
2007 deaths
People educated at Newington College
World War II prisoners of war held by Japan
Businesspeople from Sydney
Members of the Order of Australia
Members of Newington College Council
Australian prisoners of war
20th-century Australian businesspeople